The 1931 Copa de Competencia Jockey Club was the final that decided the champion of the 16th edition of the National cup of Argentina. The final was held in All Boys stadium in Monte Castro, on 28 February 1932. As the match ended 1–1, a playoff was held at the stadium of Club Atlético Excursionistas in Belgrano, on March 3, 1932.

Sportivo Balcarce beat Almagro 4–1 and won its first and only title in the top division of Argentine football.

Qualified teams 

Note

Overview 
This edition was contested by 40 clubs from Primera División (first division) and Primera B (second division) plus one team, "Ferrocarriles del Estado" not belonging any of those divisions. Teams were grouped in six zones, North 1, North 2, South 1, South 2, South 3 and West.

Sportivo Balcarce (in "North 2" group), played against General San Martín (3–0), Excursionistas, Porteño (unknown score in both cases), lost to Sportivo Palermo (0–4), and drew with Alvear de Caseros (3–3), and Ferrocarriles del Estado (1–1) in 7 rounds, qualifying for the second stage. In quarter finals, Balcarce beat Defensores de Belgrano (3–0) and then defeated Argentino de Quilmes in semifinals (unknown score).
On the other side, Almagro (in "West" group) beat All Boys (3–1), Liberal Argentino (3–0), La Paternal (1–0), Estudiantil Porteño (3–0), drew with Palermo (1–1), and lost to Estudiantes (BA) (0–2), finishing first of the group with 13 points. In semifinals, Almagro beat Barracas Central in playoff 3–0 after the match had ended 1–1.

Match details

Final 

Suspended at 80' for foul play from both teams

Playoff 

Players of Almagro left the field on 72'.

Notes

References 

j
j
Football in Buenos Aires